The Rural Municipality of Glen McPherson No. 46 is a rural municipality (RM) in the Canadian province of Saskatchewan within Census Division No. 3 and  Division No. 3. It is located in the southwest portion of the province.

History 

The RM of Glen McPherson No. 46 incorporated as a rural municipality on January 1, 1913. When the municipality was formed in 1913, the new council considered a variety of names. One proposal would have honoured Glenelg, a Scottish village which once served as the Isle of Skye ferry terminus. Also proposed was McPherson, named for a civil servant in the municipal field who might assist the new government. The final name is a combination of these two choices - Glen McPherson. A rural post office was soon named after the RM, and operated at NE31-5-11-W3 from 1915 to 1946.

As in most rural Saskatchewan jurisdictions, taxation and public works were originally managed by a nameless Local Improvement District, subordinate to the provincial government. During this period, all roadwork and bridge-building was done by government crews, while land taxes were paid directly to Regina.

Formation of a municipal government was requested, and subsequently granted, in 1913. The school districts of Tweed, Buffalo Horn, and Divide were organized within the year, with Coriander, Banff, and South Pinto following through to 1916. Upon incorporation, the local population was estimated at 800, 275 being resident farmers. By 1917, internal estimates placed the population at 1,300 and 400 resident farmers, a number which has declined ever since.

Never possessing a single-purpose office building within its boundaries, the RM Council met inside a private residence until it burned in 1922, destroying most of the municipality's early records. Following this, meetings were held at the Broncho school, centrally located within the district. Telephone service arrived in 1927, when the Ponteix Rural Telephone Company line reached the RM, and was further extended south from Aneroid in 1931. The Canadian Pacific Railway surveyed the southern part of the RM in the same year, with the intention of building a branch line from Val Marie to Mankota. But conditions of prolonged drought and crop failure permanently halted construction, leaving Glen McPherson the somewhat unusual distinction of having never contained a single town, village, or mile of railway.

Heritage properties
There are two historical properties located within the RM.
Billimun Church (previously called the St. Martin's Roman Catholic Church)- Constructed in 1927, in Billimun, Saskatchewan.
Reliance Community Centre (previously called the Ferland School; Reliance School; Divide School District No. 2894.)- Constructed in 1915 as a one room school in Reliance, Saskatchewan, the building is now used as a community centre.

Demographics 

At its population of 72, the RM of Glen McPherson No. 46 is the least populated rural municipality in Saskatchewan.

In 2016, 60 residents of the RM of Glen McPherson No. 46 reported English as their mother tongue, 10 French, and 5 a Germanic language, while 10 reported knowledge of both English and French and 5 reported speaking French at home.

Government 
The RM of Glen McPherson No. 46 is governed by an elected municipal council and an appointed administrator that meets on the second Thursday of every month. The reeve of the RM is Trevor Chanig while its administrator is Debra Shaw. The RM's office is located in Mankota.

The RM of Glen McPherson No. 46 is one of 103 RMs in Saskatchewan that did not hold municipal elections in 2018, as every candidate was acclaimed in their district. Amalgamation with neighbouring Mankota has been discussed for more than 50 years, as both governments already share an administrative employee and an email address. Despite this possibility, local officials state that Glen McPherson's boundaries are likely to remain intact because of its sound finances and a desire for cultural continuity among its few remaining ratepayers.

See also 
 Loving County, Texas - the least-populated county in the United States
 Municipal District of Ranchland No. 66 - the least-populated rural municipality in neighbouring Alberta, with 92 residents in 2016

References 

G
Division No. 3, Saskatchewan